Wild syringa is a common name for several plants and may refer to:

 Burkea africana
 Philadelphus